Headley is a village in Hampshire, England.

Governance
The village of Headley is part of the civil parish of Ashford Hill with Headley and is part of the Kingsclere ward of the Borough of Basingstoke and Deane.

References

Villages in Hampshire